James Der Derian is the Michael Hintze Chair of International Security Studies and Director of the Centre for International Security Studies at The University of Sydney, having taken up his appointment in January 2013. His research and teaching interests are in international security, information technology, international theory and documentary film.

Prior to his appointment, Der Derian was a Watson Institute research professor of international studies and professor of political science at Brown University. In July 2004, he became the director of the Institute's Global Security Program. Der Derian also directed the Information Technology, War, and Peace Project in the Watson Institute's Global Security Program.

Der Derian was educated at McGill University and was a Rhodes Scholar at Balliol College at Oxford University, where he completed a M.Phil. and D.Phil. in international relations.  At Balliol, his D.Phil supervisor was Hedley Bull.

He has been a visiting scholar at the University of Southern California, MIT, Harvard, Oxford, Copenhagen University and at the Institute for Advanced Study in Princeton. He was also tenured at the University of Massachusetts Amherst.

He is author of On Diplomacy: A Genealogy of Western Estrangement (1987) and Antidiplomacy: Spies, Terror, Speed, and War (1992); editor of International Theory: Critical Investigations (1995) and The Virilio Reader (1998); co-editor with Michael Shapiro of International/Intertextual Relations: Postmodern Readings of World Politics (1989); Global Voices: Dialogues In International Relations (with others) (1993);  and, Virtuous War: Mapping the Military-Industrial-Media-Entertainment Network (2001; 2nd edition, 2009).  His most recent books are a collection of selected essays, titled Critical Practices of International Relations: Selected Essays (2009), and a co-edited volume with Alexander Wendt, Quantum International Relations:  A Human Science for World Politics (2022).

His articles on international relations have appeared in the Review of International Studies, International Studies Quarterly, Cambridge Review of International Affairs, International Affairs, Brown Journal of World Affairs, Millennium, Alternatives, Cultural Values, and Samtiden. His articles on war, technology, and the media have appeared in The New York Times, The Nation, Washington Quarterly, and Wired.

Der Derian has produced three film documentaries with Udris Film, Virtual Y2K, After 9/11, and most recently, Human Terrain: War Becomes Academic, which won the Audience Award at the 2009 Festival dei Popoli in Florence and has been an official selection at numerous international film festivals. His most recent documentary, Project Z: The Final Global (co-produced with Phillip Gara), premiered at the 2012 DOK Leipzig Film Festival.

Der Derian is the recipient of the Bosch Berlin Prize in Public Policy and Fellow at the American Academy in Berlin from January - March 2011.

References

The University of Sydney Department of Government and International Relations. (n.d.). Retrieved November 25, 2014, from http://sydney.edu.au/arts/government_international_relations/staff/profiles/james.derderian.php

Further reading

External links
Professor James Der Derian - The University of Sydney
 James Der Derian's page at Brown University

 Listen to James Der Derian
James Der Derian at American Academy in Berlin
James Der Derian LinkedIn

American people of Armenian descent
Brown University faculty
Harvard University staff
American Rhodes Scholars
Alumni of Balliol College, Oxford
Massachusetts Institute of Technology faculty
University of Southern California faculty
University of Massachusetts Amherst faculty
Living people
McGill University alumni
Year of birth missing (living people)